Portugal-Sweden relations are foreign relations between Portugal and Sweden.  Portugal has an embassy in Stockholm. Sweden has an embassy in Lisbon. 
Both countries are full members of the European Union and of the Council of Europe. Portugal is a full member of NATO, while Sweden is not a full member. Portugal strongly supports Sweden's NATO membership.

History 
Portugal joined 1986 and Sweden 1995 joined in the European Union.
In October of 2022, Portugal have fully ratified Sweden's NATO membership application.

References

See also 
 Foreign relations of Portugal
 Foreign relations of Sweden

External links  
Sweden - Countries - Bilateral Relations - Diplomatic Portal 
Portugal - Sweden Abroad
Embassy of Portugal in Sweden
Embassy of Sweden in Lisbon
 
 
 
Portugal–Sweden relations 
Bilateral relations of Portugal
Bilateral relations of Sweden